Kodam XII/Tanjungpura (XII Military Regional Command/Tanjungpura), is an Indonesian Army Regional Military Command that covers West Kalimantan and Central Kalimantan province. Kodam Tanjungpura also oversees the defense of Indonesian border region with the Malaysian state of Sarawak.

Brief history 
The command traces its roots to a decree of the Chief of Staff of the Army dated 2 February 1950 which established the G Brigade of the 1st Military Area Western Kalimantan, which later became the Western Kalimantan Military Region and the 12th Military Region, which was in existence until 1985.

Since 28 June 2010, the former 6th Military Region was divided into two military regions: Kodam VI/Mulawarman responsible for the provinces of East Kalimantan, South Kalimantan, and North Kalimantan and the new Kodam XII/Tanjungpura, responsible for the provinces of West Kalimantan and Central Kalimantan.

Territorial Units 
Territorial Units in Kodam XII/Tanjungpura comprise two Military Area Commands (Korem) and a self-supporting Military District Command (Kodim).
 Korem 102/Panju Panjung, consisted of nine MDCs:
 Kodim 1011/Kuala Kapuas
 Kodim 1012/Buntok
 Kodim 1013/Muara Teweh
 Kodim 1014/Pangkalan Bun
 Kodim 1015/Sampit
 Kodim 1016/Palangka Raya
 631st Raider Infantry Btn/Antang Elang
 Korem 121/Alambhana Wanawai, consisted of ten MDCs:
 Kodim 1201/Mempawah
 Kodim 1202/Singkawang
 Kodim 1203/Ketapang
 Kodim 1204/Sanggau
 Kodim 1205/Sintang
 Kodim 1206/Putussibau
 Kodim 1208/Sambas
 643rd Mechanized Infantry Btn/Wanara Sakti
 Kodim 1207/Pontianak (self-supporting)

Combat / Combat Support Units 
 19th Infantry Brigade/Khatulistiwa
 Brigade HQ
 642nd Infantry Battalion/Kapuas
 644th Special Raider Infantry Battalion/Walet Sakti
 645th Infantry Battalion/Gardatama Yudha
 641st Raider Infantry Battalion/Beruang Hitam
 12th Assault Cavalry Squadron/Beruang Cakti
 12th Cavalry Troop (Separate)
 16th Field Artillery Battalion/Tumbak Kaputing
 6th Combat Engineers Battalion/Satya Digdaya
 Air Defense Missile Artillery Detachment

Training Units 
Training units in Kodam Tanjungpura are organised under Kodam XII/Tanjungpura Regional Training Regiment/Resimen Induk Kodam XII/Tanjungpura(Rindam XII/Tanjungpura), the units are:
 Regimental HQ
 Satuan Dodik Latpur (Combat Training Command Unit)
 Satuan Dodik Kejuruan (Specialised Training Command Unit)
 Sekolah Calon Bintara (Non-Commissioned Officer Training School)
 Sekolah Calon Tamtama A (Enlisted Training School)
 Sekolah Calon Tamtama B (Enlisted Training School)
 Satuan Dodik Bela Negara (National Defence Training Command Unit)

Support formations 
 MRC XII/Tanjungpura Military Police Command (Pomdam XII/Tanjungpura)
 MRC XII/Tanjungpura Public Relations Bureau (Pendam XII/Tanjungpura)
 MRC XII/Tanjungpura Adjutant General's Office (Anjendam XII/Tanjungpura)
 MRC XII/Tanjungpura Military Physical Fitness and Sports Bureau (Jasdam XII/Tanjungpura)
 MRC XII/Tanjungpura Medical Department (Kesdam XII/Tanjungpura)
 MRC XII/Tanjungpura Veterans and National Reserves Administration (Babiminvetcadam XII/Tanjungpura)
 MRC XII/Tanjungpura Topography Service (Topdam XII/Tanjungpura)
 MRC XII/Tanjungpura Chaplaincy Corps (Bintaldam XII/Tanjungpura)
 MRC XII/Tanjungpura Finance Office (Kudam XII/Tanjungpura)
 MRC XII/Tanjungpura Legal Affairs Office (Kumdam XII/Tanjungpura)
 MRC XII/Tanjungpura HQ and HQ Services Detachment (Denmadam XII/Tanjungpura)
 MRC XII/Tanjungpura Information and Communications Technology Oiffice (Infolahtadam XII/Tanjungpura)
 MRC XII/Tanjungpura Supply Corps (Bekangdam XII/Tanjungpura)
 MRC XII/Tanjungpura Transportation Corps (Hubdam XII/Tanjungpura)
 MRC XII/Tanjungpura Ordnance Corps (Paldam XII/Tanjungpura)
 MRC XII/Tanjungpura Engineering Division (Zidam XII/Tanjungpura)
 MRC XII/Tanjungpura Signals Unit (Sandidam XII/Tanjungpura)
 MRC XII/Tanjungpura Intelligence Detachment (Deninteldam XII/Tanjungpura)

References

External links 
 
 

12
Kalimantan
Military units and formations established in 1958
Indonesian Army
1958 establishments in Indonesia